PEO, the Pancyprian Federation of Labour, is an umbrella organization for trade unions in Cyprus, which evolved from PSE. It was instrumental in the 1948 strikes in the mines of the Cyprus Mines Corporation and has been closely related to AKEL.

History
When AKEL was declared illegal by the British colonial government of Cyprus in 1955, PEO and especially its leader Andreas Ziartides was the only legal leftwing political entity and it was expressing the politics of underground AKEL.

PEO had a membership from all ethnic groups in Cyprus. In 1958 the Turkish Cypriot nationalistic organisation TMT launched a terror campaign against Turkish Cypriot members of PEO, killing the journalist Fazıl Önder and attempting to kill the head of PEO's Turkish bureau, Ahmet Sadi. Following those events, most Turkish Cypriots left the union,  and PEO's members since then have primarily been Greek Cypriots. The PEO is affiliated with the World Federation of Trade Unions.

List of general secretaries:
Andreas Fantis (1941-1943)
Andreas Ziartides (1943-1987)
Pavlos Diglis (1987-1990)
Abraham Antoniou (1990-1999)
Pambis Kyritsis (1999-2022)
Sotiroula Charalambous (2022-present)

See also

 AKEL
 World Federation of Trade Unions

Footnotes

References

External links
 Official Web Site

1941 establishments in Cyprus
National federations of trade unions
Trade unions in Cyprus
World Federation of Trade Unions